The Belgian Friendship Building or Belgian Pavilion is the former exhibition building for Belgium from the 1939/1940 World's Fair in New York City. It now serves as Barco-Stevens Hall on the campus of Virginia Union University (VUU), in Richmond, Virginia.

Design 
It was designed by Belgian architects Victor Bourgeois and Leon Stynen under Henry van de Velde, and is notable as an early example of Modernist architecture in the United States. Due to the outbreak of World War II, the Pavilion could not be returned to Belgium. The Belgian government sponsored a competition to determine the building's new home. VUU won, and the Pavilion moved to Richmond in 1941 as VUU's Belgian Friendship Building. Through 1997, the university's library was also located in the Belgian Friendship Building. The building was damaged by Hurricane Isabel in 2003. It is now VUU's gymnasium.

Relocation 
In 1942, an African American architect named  Charles Thaddeus Russell's supervised the move and reconstruction of the Belgian Building on the Virginia Union University grounds. 27 institutions wanted the building but it was granted to Virginia Union University.

Gallery

References

External links

Belgian Building, Lombardy Street & Brook Road, Richmond, Independent City, VA: 7 photos, 1 color transparency, and 2 photo caption pages at Historic American Buildings Survey

Historic American Buildings Survey in Virginia
University and college buildings on the National Register of Historic Places in Virginia
Belgium–United States relations
Buildings and structures in Richmond, Virginia
1939 New York World's Fair
World's fair architecture in the United States
Architecture in Belgium
Virginia Union University
Relocated buildings and structures in Virginia
Modernist architecture in Virginia
National Register of Historic Places in Richmond, Virginia
Sports venues in Richmond, Virginia
Henry van de Velde buildings